Anne Borg ( Nicolaisen; 28 September 1936 – 19 December 2016) was a ballet dancer and choreographer.

She was appointed ballet director at the Opera from 1970-77, and a second period from 1983 to 1988. She served as rector at the Norwegian National Academy of Ballet from 1991 to 1995. In 1988 she was decorated Knight, First Class of the Order of St. Olav. 

Borg received the Oslo City art award in 1978 and the Arts Council Norway Honorary Award in 2013.

References

External links
 

1936 births
2016 deaths
Norwegian ballerinas
Academic staff of the Oslo National Academy of the Arts
Entertainers from Oslo